Tiropramide (INN) is an antispasmodic.

References 

Drugs acting on the gastrointestinal system and metabolism
Benzamides
Phenol ethers
Diethylamino compounds